Ivan Hašek (born 6 September 1963) is a Czech professional football coach and former player.

Hašek played as a central midfielder, and spent 11 years of his career with Sparta Prague, appearing in more than 300 official games with the club, and later acting as its manager. Hašek represented Czechoslovakia at the 1990 World Cup, and was also president of the Football Association of the Czech Republic.

Playing career
Hašek was born in Městec Králové. During his 21-year career, he represented AC Sparta Prague (two spells), RC Strasbourg, Sanfrecce Hiroshima and JEF United Ichihara. With the French club, he played two seasons apiece in Ligue 1 and Ligue 2 and, in his last days as a player, spent at main side Sparta, teamed up with cousin Martin.

Hašek played for Czechoslovakia, gaining 55 caps and scored five goals. He was a participant in the 1990 FIFA World Cup, where the national side reached the quarterfinals, with him as team captain; in the group stage 5–1 routing of the United States, he scored the third. After the match, Hašek said:  "We are sorry for the score".

Coaching career
A coach since 1999, Hašek managed former clubs Sparta Prague and Strasbourg, as well as Vissel Kobe, Al Wasl FC and AS Saint-Étienne. In December 2007, he took the reins of Dubai-based Al-Ahli.

In June 2009, Hašek became president of the Czech Football Association. However, on 7 July, he announced that he was taking over the national team as head coach, until the end of the 2010 World Cup qualifiers.

Hasek announced his resignation as Czech Republic manager on 14 October 2009. On 26 June 2011, he left his role as FA president and returned to club action and Al-Ahli Dubai.

In January 2012, Hašek took over the head coach job at Riyadh-based team Al-Hilal FC, replacing Thomas Doll.

In July 2014, Hašek succeeded a long-time coach Sebastião Lazaroni as the new coach of Qatar SC ahead of the 2014–15 season.

On 15 July 2021, Hašek was appointed head coach of the Lebanon national team, on a one-year contract. After failing to qualify Lebanon to the 2022 FIFA World Cup, finishing last in their group, Hašek's contract expired.

Personal life
Hašek is also a lawyer. His two sons, Pavel and Ivan Jr, are also professional footballers.

Career statistics

Club

International

Managerial

Honours

Player
Sparta Prague
Czechoslovak First League: 1983–84, 1984–85, 1986–87, 1987–88, 1988–89
Czechoslovak Cup: 1983–84, 1987–88, 1988–89

Individual
Czechoslovak Footballer of the Year: 1987, 1988

Manager
Sparta Prague
Czech First League: 1999–2000, 2000–01

Al-Ahli
UAE Pro-League: 2008–09
UAE Super Cup: 2009

Al-Hilal
Saudi Crown Prince Cup: 2011–12

References

External links

 
 
 
 
 
 
 Ivan Hašek at RC Strasbourg 

1963 births
Living people
People from Městec Králové
Czechoslovak footballers
Czech footballers
Association football midfielders
AC Sparta Prague players
RC Strasbourg Alsace players
Sanfrecce Hiroshima players
JEF United Chiba players
Czech First League players
Ligue 1 players
Ligue 2 players
J1 League players
Czech Republic international footballers
Czechoslovakia international footballers
1990 FIFA World Cup players
Dual internationalists (football)
Czech football managers
AC Sparta Prague managers
RC Strasbourg Alsace managers
AS Saint-Étienne managers
Vissel Kobe managers
Al-Wasl F.C. managers
Czech Republic national football team managers
Al Hilal SFC managers
Qatar SC managers
Emirates Club managers
Fujairah FC managers
Lebanon national football team managers
Czech First League managers
Ligue 2 managers
Ligue 1 managers
J1 League managers
UAE Pro League managers
Saudi Professional League managers
Qatar Stars League managers
Czechoslovak expatriate footballers
Czech expatriate footballers
Czech expatriate football managers
Czechoslovak expatriate sportspeople in France
Czech expatriate sportspeople in France
Czech expatriate sportspeople in Japan
Czech expatriate sportspeople in Gabon
Czech expatriate sportspeople in the United Arab Emirates
Czech expatriate sportspeople in Saudi Arabia
Czech expatriate sportspeople in Qatar
Czech expatriate sportspeople in Lebanon
Expatriate footballers in France
Expatriate footballers in Japan
Expatriate football managers in France
Expatriate football managers in Japan
Expatriate football managers in Gabon
Expatriate football managers in the United Arab Emirates
Expatriate football managers in Saudi Arabia
Expatriate football managers in Qatar
Expatriate football managers in Lebanon
Sportspeople from the Central Bohemian Region